Ravindra Singh may refer to:

Ravindra Singh (film director), Indian film director and producer
Ravindra Singh Bisht, Indian archaeologist
Ravindra Singh (ichthyologist), Ichthyologist.